The Minister of Border Security and Organized Crime Reduction was a short-lived secondary ministerial position under Public Safety Canada with focus of combating organized crime and "irregular migration."

It was a new portfolio introduced in July 2018 during the government of Justin Trudeau. Some criticisms upon its creation included that, it fuelled an "unfounded sense of crisis;" wantonly conflated border security and organized crime; and added further confusion regarding roles and responsibilities, as there already exists overlaps between the portfolio of Immigration, Refugees and Citizenship and that of Public Safety and Emergency Preparedness (which includes the Canada Border Services Agency and the RCMP).

The last and only office holder was Bill Blair.

List of Ministers

References

Public safety ministries
Ministries established in 2018
Ministries disestablished in 2019

Border_Security_and_Organized_Crime_Reduction